Luigi Kasimir (1881–1962) was an Austro-Hungarian-born etcher, painter, printmaker and landscape artist.

Personal life
Kasimir was born in 1881 at Pettau, today Ptuj, Slovenia, then a part of the Austro-Hungarian monarchy. He inherited his talent from his ancestors; his grandfather was a painter and a poet, and his father an officer in the Habsburg army, who later became a professional painter. Kasimir attended the Vienna Academy of Art where he studied under William Unger, who introduced him to the technique of the coloured etching, and also to his future wife, the artist Tanna Hoernes. He died in 1962 in Grinzing, a suburb of Vienna.He was an early National Socialist and took over the Jewish firm that had represented him. https://www.geschichtewiki.wien.gv.at/Luigi_Kasimir. See also his role in the purchase of paintings by Egon Schiele from.the Rieger collection. 

Activity at the time of National Socialism and process

Kasimir joined the NSDAP in 1933 [2] which was banned in Austria from June 20 [3]. He also belonged to the illegal Sturmabteilung of the NSDAP. [4]

After the end of National Socialist rule, Kasimir was charged in November 1945 with high treason, illegal membership in the NSDAP since 1933 and failure to register. The trial began on June 16, 1946 before the Austrian People's Court in Vienna. On June 22, 1946, Kasimir was sentenced to 18 months of severe, aggravated prison for illegality and registration fraud.

Furthermore, Kasimir was also accused of unlawful enrichment through the Aryanization of the Halm & Goldmann art dealership . Apparently, after the "Anschluss" of Austria on March 13, 1938, Kasimir used his early party membership to acquire the Vienna-based art dealership. In October 1938, together with the art publisher Ernst Edhoffer, Kasimir and the art publisher Ernst Edhoffer signed a contract with the previous owner Elsa Gall, who until then had had the exclusive right to sell Kasimir's etchings, for a purchase price of 73,000 Reichsmarks (RM). Gall was Jewishorigin and had decided to sell due to the events that had happened. She then had to emigrate to the USA in May 1939 . As a result, Kasimir and Edhoffer did not meet the payment demands against Gall and probably only made a down payment of 10,000 RM to them. The company was entered in the commercial register on January 20, 1939 under the new name of Edhoffer & Kasimir .

As part of his work for his company Edhoffer & Kasimir , there was another case of suspected Aryanization by Kasimir. In March 1941 he bought part of the extensive art collection of the Jewish dentist and art collector Obermedizinalrat Heinrich Rieger for about 17,000 RM, which was dubious for the collection, which, alongside the Reichel Collection , was one of the most important of Austrian modern art [5] estimated value would have corresponded. Kasimir sold a large part of the collection he had acquired in this way during the war years. [6]

However, during the trial in June 1946, both Kasimir and Edhoffer were acquitted of disproportionate enrichment through Aryanization under the War Crimes Act, since Kasimir had recognized all claims for restitution within the framework of the Austrian restitution against him and the company Edhoffer & Kasimir .

In February 1947, the housing office of the City of Vienna conducted a search of Luigi Kasimir's apartment at Operngasse 13. The search resulted in the discovery of a total of 13 pictures with an estimated value of several 100,000 shillings , which was determined later . Allegedly, Kasimir's former secretary had hidden the works in the apartment from an impending confiscation. The pictures that were confiscated when they were found were remnants of the Rieger collection, as well as pictures that had belonged to the daughter of the Jewish lawyer Benedikt and which Kasimir was said to have been given to "care". The origin of other images remained unclear.

As the newspaper Neues Österreich reported on February 7, 1947, Kasimir was released early from prison on the basis of a doctor's application because of a severe liver disease.

Techniques
Kasimir was among the first to develop the technique of the coloured etching. Before this, prints were usually hand-coloured with the colour being applied in a casual, haphazard manner. Kasimir would first create a sketch—usually in pastel. He then transferred the design on as many as four to six plates, printing one after the other and applying the colour on the plate—all done by hand.

Genres
Kasimir is mainly famous for his etchings, but he also produced some oil painting, as well as some pastels. One of his favourite genres was the landscape, or veduta. He demonstrated a predisposition for monuments, street scenes, and tourist landmarks. He depicted places from all over Europe, mainly Italy, Austria, and Germany. He also travelled to the United States to do a series of etchings of famous sights ranging from urban landmarks such as New York City skyscrapers to natural wonders like  Yosemite Valley. Luigi Kasimir’s etchings can be seen in many galleries and museums, from the New York Metropolitan Museum of Art to countless galleries and fine print collections around the world.

He designed a bookplate for Sigmund Freud, who also hung an etching of the Roman Forum by Kasimir in his consulting room.

References

External links 
 Kerwin Galleries selection of Kasimir etchings
 The Incurable Collector presents Kasimir family etchings
The Kasimir Museum - Marietta, GA

1881 births
1962 deaths
20th-century Austrian painters
Austrian male painters
Austrian etchers
Austro-Hungarian people
People from Ptuj
People from Döbling
20th-century printmakers
20th-century Austrian male artists